Anacarsis Cardona de Salonia (4 July 1929 – 17 November 1987) was a Colombian lawyer and politician. She was elected to the Chamber of Representatives in 1958 as one of the first group of women to enter Congress.

Biography
A member of the Liberal Party,  Cardona was a candidate in Caldas in the 1958 parliamentary elections and was elected to the Chamber of Representatives, becoming one of the first group of women to enter Congress. She remained a member until the 1960 elections.

References

Colombian women lawyers
Colombian Liberal Party politicians
Members of the Chamber of Representatives of Colombia
20th-century Colombian women politicians
20th-century Colombian politicians
20th-century Colombian lawyers
1929 births
1987 deaths